Uzunyurt is a neighborhood of Fethiye district in Muğla Province, Turkey.

Geography 
The village is generally known as Faralya. It is 165 km from Muğla, 25 km from Fethiye and 10 km from the sea. It is possible to reach historical Roman and Lycian ruins, Butterfly Valley and various natural riches in the region where the neighborhood is located (within an area of 40 km).

Population

References 

Villages in Fethiye District